Bordon is a former railway station on the Bordon Light Railway which served the English village of Bordon, Hampshire and its nearby army camp.

History
The station building was constructed of corrugated iron on steel framing and stood on a short brick wall. Extra traffic during the First World War led to the extension of the station and the addition of a wooden canopy on its platform side. The station also had a small engine shed which was used in the line's early days for overnight stabling of engines. The shed was later to be damaged by an engine running through its rear, and it was left afterwards to become derelict. Eleven railway cottages were constructed by the London and South Western Railway near the station to accommodate staff: all were either semi-detached or terraced except no. 8 which was the stationmaster's residence. A small wooden signalbox located at the approach of the station completed the layout.

It was possible to change at Bordon for services on the Longmoor Military Railway towards Liss, although a physical connection to the main Waterloo-Portsmouth line there was not established until 1942.

Closure
Decreasing use saw the up platform become overgrown in the 1930s, resulting in it being cut back to half its original length. Nevertheless, it still saw very little use and by the late 1950s was very overgrown. Following the closure of the line in 1966, the station buildings were demolished and the land was sold for commercial use. The "Bordon Trading Estate" now stands on the site.

The Association of Train Operating Companies have applied for funding for the reopening of this station, following the publication of its report Connecting Communities: Expanding Access to the Rail Network.

Services

South Western Railway run a coach frequently to Farnham railway station to connect with trains. These formerly ran to Liphook but were amended to run to Farnham by South West Trains, due to the shorter journey time to London Waterloo.

See also 

 List of closed railway stations in Britain

References

External links 
 Bordon station on Subterranea Britannica

Disused railway stations in Hampshire
Former London and South Western Railway stations
Railway stations in Great Britain opened in 1905
Railway stations in Great Britain closed in 1966